"I Never Loved You Anyway" is a song by Irish band the Corrs, released in December 1997 as the second single from their second album, Talk on Corners (1997). The music was written by the band with Carole Bayer Sager, who also wrote the lyrics alongside Andrea Corr. The song became a top-50 hit in Australia and the United Kingdom, as well as on the Canadian RPM Adult Contemporary chart. The track earned producer David Foster a nomination for Producer of the Year at the 1999 Juno Awards.

Critical reception
Larry Flick of Billboard wrote, "Merging traditional Celtic music with pop/rock is tricky biz, but this act does so with deceptive ease—with a big thanks to kingpin producer David Foster; of course. "I Never Loved You Anyway" oozes delicious cynicism, all while a shuffle beat propels an arrangement of Celtic instruments and acoustic guitars. A bit too sophisticated and smart for top 40, this is perfect for adult-oriented stations in need of something fresh and uptempo." British magazine Music Week gave the song three out of five, adding, "The Irish sibling quartet are in Alisha's Attic territory here complete with tin whistle and bodhran break."

Music video
The accompanying music video for the song was shot in Ireland, at an abandoned market building in Dublin. The video presents the Corrs in a more casual setting compared to the more glam and stylish look of their previous video, "Only When I Sleep". The video was shot by director Dani Jacobs who would later go on to direct many of the Corrs' future videos, including "Dreams", "So Young", "Would You Be Happier?", and Andrea Corr's solo single "Shame on You".

For this video, he chose to add a few visual gimmicks in the form of shooting through transparent photos of flowers and small pieces of mirror. The writings on the walls which can be seen throughout the video were added later after Jacobs went around town filming graffiti and poetry. The words "I Never Loved You Anyway" however could not be found anywhere and had to be written on a wall.

Jacobs noted some interesting challenges during the shooting of video with seagulls flying in and out of the building for shelter due to the heavy rain on the day of the shoot. Sharon Corr once said that in some shots, birds can be seen landing in the galleries.

Track listings
 UK and Australian CD single
 "I Never Loved You Anyway" (edit) – 3:53
 "What I Know" – 3:48
 "I Never Loved You Anyway" (acoustic) – 3:53

 UK cassette single and European CD single
 "I Never Loved You Anyway" (edit) – 3:53
 "What I Know" – 3:48

Credits and personnel
Credits are lifted from the UK CD single liner notes and the Talk on Corners album booklet.

Studios
 Recorded at Chartmaker Studios (Malibu, California)
 Additional recording at the Record Plant (Los Angeles)
 Mixed at Mix This! Studio (Pacific Palisades, Los Angeles)
 Mastered at Gateway Mastering (Portland, Maine, US)

Personnel

 The Corrs – writing, arrangement
 Andrea Corr – lyrics, tin whistle
 Caroline Corr – bodhrán
 Jim Corr – guitars, keyboards
 Sharon Corr – violin
 Carole Bayer Sager – writing, lyrics
 Tim Pierce – guitars
 John Robinson – drums

 David Foster – production, arrangement
 Felipe Elgueta – recording, synth programming
 David Reitzas – additional recording
 Leo Pearson – synth programming
 Bob Clearmountain – mixing
 Ryan Freeland – mixing assistant
 Bob Ludwig – mastering

Charts

Release history

References

1997 singles
143 Records singles
Atlantic Records singles
The Corrs songs
Lava Records singles
Songs written by Carole Bayer Sager